"He's Got the Whole World in His Hands" is a traditional African-American spiritual, first published in 1927.  It became an international pop hit in 1957–58 in a recording by English singer Laurie London, and has been recorded by many other singers and choirs.

Traditional music sources
The song was first published in the paperbound hymnal Spirituals Triumphant, Old and New in 1927.  In 1933, it was collected by Frank Warner from the singing of Sue Thomas in North Carolina. It was also recorded by other collectors such as Robert Sonkin of the Library of Congress, who recorded it in Gee's Bend, Alabama in 1941.  That version is still available at the Library's American Folklife Center.

Frank Warner performed the song during the 1940s and 1950s, and introduced it to the American folk scene. Warner recorded it on the Elektra album American Folk Songs and Ballads in 1952. It was quickly picked up by both American gospel singers and British skiffle and pop musicians.

Laurie London recording

The song made the popular song charts in a 1957 recording by English singer Laurie London with the Geoff Love Orchestra, which reached #12 on the UK singles chart in late 1957.  The songwriting on London's record was credited to "Robert Lindon" and "William Henry", which were pseudonyms used by British writers Jack Waller and Ralph Reader, who had used the song in their 1956 stage musical Wild Grows the Heather.

Laurie London's version then rose to #1 of the Most Played by Jockeys song list in the USA and went to number three on the R&B charts in 1958. The record reached #2 on Billboard's Best Sellers in Stores survey and #1 in Cashbox's Top 60.   It became a gold record and was the most successful record by a British male in the 1950s in the USA.   It was the first, and remains, the only gospel song to hit #1 on a U.S. pop singles chart; "Put Your Hand in the Hand (of the Man)" by Ocean peaked at #2 on the Billboard Hot 100 singles chart in 1971; and "Oh Happy Day" by the Edwin Hawkins Singers reached #3 on the Billboard Hot 100 singles chart in 1969.

Covers and adaptations

Mahalia Jackson's version made the Billboard top 100 singles chart, topping at number 69.

In 1953, Marian Anderson sang the song before a live television audience of 60 million persons, broadcast live over the NBC and CBS networks, as part of The Ford 50th Anniversary Show. Anderson recorded another version  (in Oslo on August 29, 1958 and released on the single His Master's Voice 45-6075 AL 6075 and on the extended play En aften på "Casino Non Stop", introdusert av Arne Hestenes (HMV 7EGN 26. It was arranged by Harry Douglas and Ed Kirkeby).

In 1964 Judy Garland sang it in a duet with her daughter Liza Minnelli at Minnelli's 'official presentation'. The concert was released as a double album, "Live" at the London Palladium.

Other notable versions were recorded by Kate Smith, Odetta, Jackie DeShannon, Perry Como, the Sandpipers (1970; "Come Saturday Morning" LP) and Nina Simone on And Her Friends (recorded 1957). Andy Williams released a version on his 1960 album, The Village of St. Bernadette. In 1982, Raffi recorded the song from his new album Rise and Shine and released it as a single. 

In 1987, American country and Christian singer Cristy Lane recorded the song and released it as a single via LS Records. Lane's version was released as a double A-side single, peaking at number 88 on the Billboard Hot Country Songs chart.

In 1991, Greg & Steve recorded the song as We've Got the Whole World from their album Playing Favorites 

The Sisters of Mercy played it at the Reading Festival in 1991. It is featured on The Good and the Bad and the Ugly bootleg album.  Pat Boone recorded a version for his 1961 album Great, Great, Great. James Booker covered the song on his 1993 album Spiders On The Keys.

In 1995, The Sisters of Glory, a gospel group that featured Thelma Houston, CeCe Peniston, Phoebe Snow, Lois Walden, and Albertina Walker, included the composition to their album Good News in Hard Times released on Warner Bros.

Mike Doughty adapted the refrain of the song for a new song of a similar title on his album Sad Man Happy Man. Additionally, Doughty's former band Soul Coughing performed a partial version live on occasion, usually as a segue into another song.

The song "Paintball's Coming Home" by Half Man Half Biscuit, from their 1997 album Voyage to the Bottom of the Road, includes the melody of "He's Got the Whole World in His Hands".

In popular culture

In February 1978, English football team Nottingham Forest F.C. released "We've Got the Whole World in Our Hands" (Warner K17110) in conjunction with local band Paper Lace; the B side featured "The Forest March". The song has become a favourite in British football grounds, with the lyrics adapted in various ways; for instance, "We're the worst team in the League" has been heard at Rushden & Diamonds matches as well as Crystal Palace F.C. matches. or "We're the worst team in the Cup" could be sung by Swindon Town F.C. supporters in EFL Cup, FA Cup and the EFL Trophy first round matches since after 2012.
In the 1982 film Tootsie, Dorothy Michaels (Dustin Hoffman) sings a line of the song to her (his) agent George Fields (Sydney Pollack), changing the words to "I've got the whole world in my hands."
The song was also used in the 1987 film Roxanne with Steve Martin.
In the 1993 film Dave, Dave Kovic visits a factory and sings the chorus of the song while telemetrically manipulating a pair of gigantic robotic arms.
In the movie Con Air (1997), Steve Buscemi plays a serial killer who sings "He's Got the Whole World" with a little girl. 
In the movie RocketMan, also from 1997, Harland Williams plays the role of an astronaut who sings "I Got the Whole World in My Hand" on a worldwide broadcast, and is then accompanied by millions of people around the world watching it.
In the 2003 HBO television series Carnivàle, Brother Justin Crowe (Clancy Brown) presides over his congregation singing the song in the episode "Milfay".
WWE wrestler Bray Wyatt started singing the song during his feud with John Cena, to accentuate Wyatt's gimmick as a cult leader. Later used during his feud with Finn Balor.
In Lego Batman 3: Beyond Gotham, Joker singing "I've got the whole world in my pants" is based on the music.
 In The City Part of Town, the children of South Park sing the chorus of the song as a Whole Foods representative enters the town.
 On Histeria’s Great Heroes of France episode, the popular spiritual is used as background music.
The second teaser trailer for the 2014 film The Boxtrolls features a version of the song titled "Whole World" by Loch Lomond.

See also 
Christian child's prayer § Spirituals
Salvator Mundi - painting of Christ with orb (Earth) in left hand.
 List of 1950s one-hit wonders in the United States

References

External links
 Lyrics of this song

1927 songs
1958 singles
Perry Como songs
Cristy Lane songs
Nina Simone songs
CeCe Peniston songs
Paper Lace songs
Andy Williams songs
Glen Campbell songs
Cashbox number-one singles
Number-one singles in Australia
Gospel songs
American children's songs
African-American spiritual songs
LS Records singles
Parlophone singles
United States National Recording Registry recordings